Kuntur Nasa (Aymara kunturi condor, nasa nose, "nose of a condor", Hispanicized spelling Condor Nasa) is a mountain in the Andes in Bolivia, about 3.800 m (12,467 ft) high. It is located in the Cordillera de los Frailes in the Potosí Department, Tomás Frías Province, Yocalla Municipality, Kuntur Nasa lies south west of the higher Pari Chata at the river Pillku Mayu ("red river").

References 

Mountains of Potosí Department